Hasha may be,

Hasha language, Nigeria
Eddie Hasha